The Bondhusbreen is a glacier in Kvinnherad Municipality in Vestland county, Norway. The glacier is an offshoot of the vast Folgefonna glacier, and it lies inside the Folgefonna National Park.

The glacier is located at the end of a small valley (named Bondhusdalen), just south of the village of Sundal on the shore of the Maurangsfjorden.  Water draining under the glacier is caught through a tunnel and exploited in the Mauranger Hydroelectric Power Station.

See also
List of glaciers in Norway

References

Glaciers of Vestland
Kvinnherad